Simone Salvati (born 5 November 1973) is an Italian snowboarder. He competed at the 2002 Winter Olympics and the 2006 Winter Olympics.

References

1973 births
Living people
Italian male snowboarders
Olympic snowboarders of Italy
Snowboarders at the 2002 Winter Olympics
Snowboarders at the 2006 Winter Olympics
Sportspeople from Bologna
21st-century Italian people